Northwestern Media is the Christian radio ministry of the University of Northwestern – St. Paul, an evangelical university in Roseville, Minnesota. Northwestern Media operates two radio networks serving listeners primarily in the Midwestern United States: the Life Network, a contemporary Christian music station, and the Faith Network with Christian talk and teaching programming.

History
Northwestern Schools, as it was then known, entered the broadcasting business with the launch of KTIS-AM-FM in the Twin Cities on February 7, 1949. The construction of KTIS, costing $40,000, was entirely underwritten by the school's students. Its radio ministry soon expanded. On April 1, 1953, it bought KBOK in Waterloo, Iowa and changed its call letters to KNWS. Growth continued with the October 25, 1955, launch of Fargo's KFNW and its 1961 acquisition of KIHO in Sioux Falls, which became KNWC. Northwestern built FM stations in all three cities in 1965 (Fargo's KFNW-FM and Waterloo's KNWS-FM) and 1969 (KNWC-FM in Sioux Falls). Northwestern acquired WRVB-FM in Madison, Wisconsin, in 1973, changing it to WNWC; the college would buy an AM station there in 1997.

In 1983, KDNI in Duluth, Minnesota came to air; it was joined by KDNW, a second frequency, in 1992. Des Moines, Iowa, became part of Northwestern Media's footprint when radio stations KJJC and KLRX were bought out of receivership and became KNWI and KNWM in 2004. KJNW FM in Kansas City was acquired in 2013 from Calvary Bible College.

Station sales
In 2010, citing years of low listener support and the fact that it was subsidized by the rest of the network, Northwestern College closed WSMR in Sarasota, Florida, which it had built in 1996; the station was sold to the University of South Florida for $1.275 million and began broadcasting classical music.

Between 2007 and 2012, Northwestern owned a third station, KFNL in the Fargo, North Dakota, area. The station was sold to a commercial broadcaster, Mediactive, LLC, in 2012 and is now KBMW-FM.

Between April and August 2018, UNW briefly owned two secular stations, KDSN-AM-FM, in Denison, Iowa. UNW had acquired the stations in order to move KDSN-FM to another frequency and facilitate a signal upgrade for KNWI.

Expansions
Northwestern acquired KLBF near Bismarck, North Dakota, from the Educational Media Foundation in 2017; KLBF became a Faith station, making it the westernmost station in the Northwestern Media portfolio and one of its few markets without a Life station. EMF had previously donated WNWW, an AM radio station in Hartford, Connecticut, to the university in 2016.

In 2018, Northwestern Media entered Omaha with its acquisition of KGBI-FM from Salem Media Group for $3.15 million.

Northwestern Media made two major network acquisitions in 2019. The first came in July when the entire Refuge Radio network was donated to UNW. Refuge owned three full-power stations and 13 dependent translators in Minnesota, Iowa and South Dakota. The Refuge network was dismantled and almost all of its transmitters converted to repeat Life and Faith stations; former network key station WJRF in Duluth was taken silent (as Northwestern already had two stations there), the two other full-power stations began simulcasting Life stations, and the translators were spread around the Life and Faith networks.

On August 6, 2019, the Illinois Bible Institute announced it would sell its New Life Radio Network (WBGL/WCIC), a two-network radio ministry primarily broadcasting in Illinois, to the University of Northwestern. UNW paid $9,901,558.34 to acquire its 13 full-power stations and eight translators. The acquisition brought UNW's number of broadcast licenses to 81 in 10 states.

In 2021, Northwestern filed to purchase KLMP and KSLT in Rapid City, South Dakota and their repeaters from Bethesda Christian Broadcasting, closing on the purchase in January 2022. It obtained new licenses for full-power non-commercial stations in Ashland, Wisconsin, and Grand Rapids, Minnesota, in 2022, and it also purchased a series of FM translators rebroadcasting KSLT from the International Church of the Foursquare Gospel that year.

In a $1.25 million transaction, UNW filed to acquire the Lake Area Educational Broadcasting Foundation, whose Spirit FM and Elevate FM services are broadcast in various cities in Missouri, in March 2023.

Stations

Faith Network

Life Network

Silent

Acquired Stations of New Life Media Network from the Illinois Bible Institute

Notes

References

University of Northwestern – St. Paul
1949 establishments in Minnesota
Christian radio stations in the United States
Christian mass media companies